The term ODT can refer to several things, among them:

Computer-related

 .ODT, the word processing file format of OpenDocument, an open standard for electronic documents
On-line Debugging Tool, a debugger used by certain software from Digital Equipment Corporation
Oracle Corporation's Oracle Developer Tools
Microsoft Office's Office Deployment Tool, a command-line tool used to deploy the click-to-run versions of Office

Media/Entertainment
Otago Daily Times, New Zealand's second oldest daily newspaper
O.D.T., Or Die Trying, is a video game created by Psygnosis for the PlayStation and PC

Other
Order-disorder transition
Orally disintegrating tablet (or orally dissolving tablet), a pill that "melts" on contact with saliva
Omnidirectional treadmill, a treadmill which can convey objects in two dimensions
Oven dry tonne, a unit to express the dried weight of an agricultural commodity such as biomass that contained significant water weight when harvested
On Die Termination, a technique to reduce bounce back of electrical signals on high speed electrical connections
Dvorak technique, also known as Objective Dvorak Technique, a technique used to estimate the strength of a tropical cyclone
Olympic Discovery Trail, a multi-use trail spanning the north end of the Olympic Peninsula in Washington